The Longyuan Rudong Intertidal Wind Farm is a 150MW offshore wind farm close to the Rudong County, Jiangsu province, China.

References

External links

  Rudong Zhongshui ( intertidal ) 100MW demonstration project - phase 1
  Jiangsu Rudong 150MW Offshore (Intertidal) Demonstration Wind Farm - phase II
   龙源江苏如东150MW海上（潮间带）示范风电场建设纪实 (Chinese)

Offshore wind farms
Wind farms in China
2012 establishments in China
Buildings and structures in Nantong
Energy infrastructure completed in 2012